Charles Frazer or Frazier may refer to:

 Charles Frazer (cricketer) (1905–1971), Australian-born English cricketer
 Charles Frazer or Charles Fraser (botanist) (1788–1831), Colonial Botanist of New South Wales, 1821–1831
 Charles Frazier (born 1950), American novelist
 Charlie Frazer (1880–1913), Australian politician
 Charley Frazier (1939–2022), American football player

See also
Charles Fraser (disambiguation)